Albertslund station is an S-train station serving the Danish capital Copenhagen suburb of Albertslund, west of the city.

It is located on the Taastrup radial of Copenhagen's S-train network. It serves the core of Albertslund, a residential suburb built virtually from scratch in the 1960s and 1970s. The extensive residential areas in the northern end of Albertslund municipality are served by local buses from Albertslund and Glostrup stations.

Facilities 
Inside the station building there is a combined ticket office and convenience store operated by 7-Eleven, a waiting room, a photo booth, toilets and an accessible toilet. There are also facilities for both bicycle and car parking near the entrance to the railway station.

Cultural references
Egon (Ove Sprogøe) is waiting for the S-train at Albertslund station at 0:12:55 in the 1975 Olsen-banden film The Olsen Gang on the Track.

See also
 List of railway stations in Denmark

References

External links

S-train (Copenhagen) stations
Buildings and structures in Albertslund Municipality
Railway stations in Denmark opened in the 20th century
1931 establishments in Denmark